Eumenes is the type genus of the subfamily Eumeninae ("potter wasps") of Vespidae. It is a large and widespread genus, with over 100 taxa (species and subspecies), mostly occurring in the temperate portions of the Northern Hemisphere. Most species are black or brown, and commonly marked with strikingly contrasting patterns of yellow, white, orange, or red (or combinations thereof). Like most vespids, their wings are folded longitudinally at rest. The first metasomal segment is narrow and elongated, creating a "bulbous" appearance to the abdomen.

The genus was named after the Greek general Eumenes. The root of the name has been widely used to construct many other genus-level names for potter wasps with petiolated metasoma, such as Brachymenes, Santamenes, Oreumenes, Pachymenes, Katamenes, etc. Most of those groups have been treated as part of the genus Eumenes for a long time.

Species

 Eumenes achterbergi Giordani Soika, 1992
 Eumenes acuminatus de Saussure, 1856
 Eumenes aemilianus Guiglia, 1951
 Eumenes affinissimus de Saussure, 1852
 Eumenes agillimus Dalla Torre, 1894
 Eumenes americanus Saussure, 1852
 Eumenes antennatus Bingham, 1898
 Eumenes aquilonius Sk. Yamane, 1977
 Eumenes architectus Smith, 1858
 Eumenes arnoldi Bequaert, 1926
 Eumenes asiaticus Gusenleitner, 1970
 Eumenes assamensis Meade-Waldo, 1910
 Eumenes atrophicus (Fabricius, 1798)
 Eumenes batantanensis Nugroho, 2010
 Eumenes belli Giordani Soika, 1973
 Eumenes bequaerti Grandinete & Carpenter, 2018
 Eumenes blandus Smith, 1861 +
 Eumenes boettcheri Giordani Soika, 1941
 Eumenes bollii Cresson, 1872 +
 Eumenes buddha Cameron, 1898
 Eumenes capensis Schulthess, 1910
 Eumenes coarctatus (Linnaeus, 1758) +
 Eumenes comberi Dover, 1925
 Eumenes congnatus Nguyen, 2016
 Eumenes consobrinus de Saussure, 1856
 Eumenes coronatus (Panzer, 1799) +
 Eumenes coyotae Bohart, 1948
 Eumenes crucifera Provancher, 1888 +
 Eumenes cubensis Cresson, 1865
 Eumenes cyrenaicus Blüthgen, 1938 +
 Eumenes dichrous Maindron, 1882
 Eumenes diligens Smith, 1864
 Eumenes dorycus Maindron, 1882
 Eumenes dubius de Saussure, 1852 +
 Eumenes ferrugiantennus Zhou, Chen & Li, 2012
 Eumenes filiformis de Saussure, 1856
 Eumenes flavitinctus Bohart, 1950
 Eumenes floralis Smith, 1858
 Eumenes formosensis Giordani Soika, 1973
 Eumenes fraterculus Dalla Torre, 1894
 Eumenes fraternus Say, 1824
 Eumenes fuellebornianus Schulthess, 1910 +
 Eumenes fulvopilosellus Giordani Soika, 1965
 Eumenes gibbosus Nguyen, 2015
 Eumenes glacialis Giordani Soika, 1940
 Eumenes gribodianus Guiglia, 1933 +
 Eumenes guillarmodi Giordani Soika, 1975
 Eumenes humbertianus de Saussure, 1867
 Eumenes improvisus Giordani Soika, 1975
 Eumenes inconspicuus Smith, 1858 +
 Eumenes insolens Smith, 1865
 Eumenes interpositus Gusenleitner, 1972
 Eumenes jarkandensis Blüthgen, 1938
 Eumenes kangrae Dover, 1925
 Eumenes kiangsuensis Giordani Soika, 1941
 Eumenes koriensis Giordani Soika, 1992
 Eumenes labiatus Giordani Soika, 1941 +
 Eumenes longus Nguyen, 2016
 Eumenes lucasius de Saussure, 1852 +
 Eumenes macrops de Saussure, 1852
 Eumenes mainpuriensis Smith, 1870
 Eumenes makilingi Williams, 1928
 Eumenes mediterraneus Kriechbaumer, 1879 +
 Eumenes micado Cameron 1904
 Eumenes micropunctatus Giordani Soika, 1975 +
 Eumenes modestus Gusenleitner, 2006
 Eumenes mongolicus Morawitz, 1889
 Eumenes multipictus de Saussure, 1855
 Eumenes nigriscutatus Zhou, Chen & Li, 2012
 Eumenes papillarius (Christ, 1791) +
 Eumenes parisii Giordani Soika, 1939
 Eumenes pedunculatus (Panzer, 1799) +
 Eumenes peringeyanus Schulthess, 1913
 Eumenes persimilis Giordani Soika, 1960
 Eumenes pictus Smith, 1857
 Eumenes piriformis de Saussure, 1862 +
 Eumenes pius Giordani Soika, 1986 +
 Eumenes placens Nurse, 1903
 Eumenes pomiformis (Fabricius, 1781)
 Eumenes pseudubius Gusenleitner, 1972
 Eumenes punctaticlypeus Giordani Soika 1943 +
 Eumenes punctatus de Saussure, 1852 +
 Eumenes quadratus Smith, 1852 +
 Eumenes relatus Dover, 1925
 Eumenes rubrofemoratus Giordani Soika, 1941
 Eumenes rubronotatus Perez, 1905 +
 Eumenes rufomaculatus (Fox, 1899)
 Eumenes sardous Guiglia, 1951
 Eumenes sareptanus André, 1884 +
 Eumenes sculleni Bohart, 1950
 Eumenes separatus Gusenleitner, 1972
 Eumenes septentrionalis Giordani Soika, 1940 +
 Eumenes signicornis Walker, 1871
 Eumenes sikkimensis Giordani Soika, 1986
 Eumenes simplicilamellatus Giordani Soika, 1934
 Eumenes smithii de Saussure, 1852 +
 Eumenes solidus Gusenleitner, 1972
 Eumenes subpomiformis Blüthgen, 1938 +
 Eumenes tosawae Giordani Soika, 1941 +
 Eumenes transbaicalicus Kurzenko, 1984
 Eumenes tricolor Smith, 1860
 Eumenes tripunctatus (Christ, 1791)
 Eumenes truncatus Nugroho, 2010
 Eumenes variepunctatus Giordani Soika, 1958
 Eumenes versicolor de Saussure, 1852
 Eumenes verticalis Say, 1824 +

References
Giordani Soika, A. 1978. Revisione degli Eumenidi neotropicali appartenenti ai generi Eumenes Latr., Omicron (Sauss.), Pararaphidoglossa  Schulth. ed affini. Boll. Mus. Civ. Stor. Nat. Venezia 29: 1-420.
Carpenter, J.M., J. Gusenleitner & M. Madl. 2010a. A Catalogue of the Eumeninae (Hymenoptera: Vespidae) of the Ethiopian Region excluding Malagasy Subregion. Part II: Genera Delta de Saussure 1885 to Zethus Fabricius 1804 and species incertae sedis. Linzer Biologischer Beitrage 42 (1): 95-315.

External links
 Eumenes wasps of Florida on the UF / IFAS Featured Creatures Web site
 Eumenes, EOL

Gallery

Biological pest control wasps
Potter wasps